Tombstone is a summit in the U.S. state of Oregon.

Tombstone was so named on account of its gray rock formation.

References

Mountains of Jackson County, Oregon
Mountains of Oregon